The 1998–99 OPJHL season is the sixth season of the Ontario Provincial Junior A Hockey League (OPJHL). The thirty-seven teams of the Central, East, and West divisions competed in a 51-game schedule.  The top eight of each division made the Buckland Cup playoffs.

The winner of the Buckland Cup, the Bramalea Blues, won the 1999 Dudley Hewitt Cup as Central Canadian Champions, but failed to win the 1999 Royal Bank Cup.

Changes
OPJHL absorbed folded Metro Junior A Hockey League.
League realigned from four to three divisions.
New teams due to merger: Auburn Jr. Crunch (Syracuse Jr. Crunch), Bancroft Hawks (Quinte Hawks), Buffalo Lightning (Niagara Scenic), Caledon Canadians, Durham Huskies, Huntsville Wildcats, Markham Waxers, North York Rangers, Oshawa Legionaires, Pickering Panthers, Port Hope Buzzards, Shelburne Wolves, Thornhill Rattlers, Wellington Dukes, and Wexford Raiders.

Final standings

Note: GP = Games played; W = Wins; L = Losses; OTL = Overtime losses; SL = Shootout losses; GF = Goals for; GA = Goals against; PTS = Points; x = clinched playoff berth; y = clinched division title; z = clinched conference title

1998-99 Frank L. Buckland Trophy Playoffs

Division Quarter-final
Collingwood Blues defeated Stouffville Spirit 3-games-to-none
Couchiching Terriers defeated Thornhill Rattlers 3-games-to-2
Newmarket Hurricanes defeated Wexford Raiders 3-games-to-1
Aurora Tigers defeated Markham Waxers 3-games-to-1
Pickering Panthers defeated Cobourg Cougars 3-games-to-none
Trenton Sting defeated Wellington Dukes 3-games-to-none
Lindsay Muskies defeated Auburn Jr. Crunch 3-games-to-none
Oshawa Legionaires defeated Kingston Voyageurs 3-games-to-1
Milton Merchants defeated Hamilton Kiltys 3-games-to-none
Bramalea Blues defeated Oakville Blades 3-games-to-none
Streetsville Derbys defeated Brampton Capitals 3-games-to-2
Georgetown Raiders defeated Burlington Cougars 3-games-to-1
Division Semi-final
Collingwood Blues defeated Aurora Tigers 4-games-to-1
Couchiching Terriers defeated Newmarket Hurricanes 4-games-to-1
Pickering Panthers defeated Oshawa Legionaires 4-games-to-2
Lindsay Muskies defeated Trenton Sting 4-games-to-2
Milton Merchants defeated Georgetown Raiders 4-games-to-1
Bramalea Blues defeated Streetsville Derbys 4-games-to-none
Division Final
Collingwood Blues defeated Couchiching Terriers 4-games-to-3
Bramalea Blues defeated Milton Merchants 4-games-to-2
Pickering Panthers defeated Lindsay Muskies 4-games-to-none
Semi-final
Milton Merchants* defeated Collingwood Blues 4-games-to-2
Bramalea Blues defeated Pickering Panthers 4-games-to-none
(*) denotes that the Merchants were welcomed back into the playoffs for another round despite losing due to their superior playoff winning percentage over Couchiching and Lindsay.

Final
Bramalea Blues defeated Milton Merchants 4-games-to-2

Dudley Hewitt Cup Championship
Best-of-7 series
Bramalea Blues defeated Rayside-Balfour Sabrecats (NOJHL) 4-games-to-none
Bramalea - Rayside-Balfour
Bramalea 2 - Rayside-Balfour 1
Bramalea 3 - Rayside-Balfour 2
Bramalea 3 - Rayside-Balfour 2

1999 Royal Bank Cup Championship
The 1999 Royal Bank Cup was hosted by the Yorkton Terriers of Yorkton, Saskatchewan.  The Bramalea Blues were defeated in the semi-final.

Round Robin
Bramalea Blues defeated Vernon Vipers (BCHL) 4-2
Bramalea Blues defeated Estevan Bruins (SJHL) 4-3
Bramalea Blues defeated Yorkton Terriers (SJHL) 5-1
Charlottetown Abbies (MJAHL) defeated Bramalea Blues 5-1

Semi-final
Vernon Vipers (BCHL) defeated Bramalea Blues 3-2

Scoring leaders
Note: GP = Games played; G = Goals; A = Assists; Pts = Points; PIM = Penalty minutes

See also
 1999 Royal Bank Cup
 Dudley Hewitt Cup
 List of OJHL seasons
 Northern Ontario Junior Hockey League
 Superior International Junior Hockey League
 Greater Ontario Junior Hockey League
 1998 in ice hockey
 1999 in ice hockey

References

External links
 Official website of the Ontario Junior Hockey League
 Official website of the Canadian Junior Hockey League

Ontario Junior Hockey League seasons
OPJHL